Joachim J. "Jack" Buono (born c. 1955) retired as Vice Admiral in the United States Maritime Service who last served as the thirteenth superintendent of the United States Merchant Marine Academy (USMMA). He took command of the Academy on November 9, 2018.

Early life and education
Buono is a 1978 graduate of the United States Merchant Marine Academy. While at USMMA, Buono received the Admiral Emory S. Land Medal and Award for outstanding achievement in Naval Architecture. At graduation, he received a bachelor’s degree in Marine Transportation, a U.S. Coast Guard license as a Third Mate (Deck), and a commission in the U.S. Navy Reserve, which he maintained for 11 years.

Career 
Immediately following graduation, he joined the Marine Department of Exxon Company USA, a predecessor organization of SeaRiver Maritime, Inc. Between 1978 and 1986 he served as a deck officer aboard various sized crude and chemical tankers before being promoted to Master Mariner. In 1991, Buono transferred ashore where he progressed through the management ranks before retiring as President and CEO of SeaRiver Maritime in 2016.  

He previously served on the Board of Trustees at the Coast Guard Foundation, and the Webb Institute, as Vice Chairman of the Oil Companies International Marine Forum, on the Board of Advisors with the International Tanker Owners Pollution Federation, as Chairman of the North America Regional Committee of the American Bureau of Shipping, and on the Board of Advisors for the Global Maritime and Transportation School at USMMA.

In addition to having earned a U.S. Coast Guard License as Master, Steam and Motor Vessels of Any Gross Tons Upon Oceans, Buono has served as Captain of:

EXXON LEXINGTON
EXXON JAMESTOWN
EXXON HOUSTON
EXXON PHILADELPHIA
EXXON CHARLESTON

He has received numerous awards and citations, most recently the Secretary of Transportation’s Gold Award for meritorious achievement in response to the COVID-19 global health emergency. He also won the U.S. Merchant Marine Academy Meritorious Service and Outstanding Professional Achievement Awards, the Seafarers International House 2017 Honoree Award, the Seamen’s Church Institute 2016 Safety Leader Award, the North America Marine Environmental Protection Association 2016 Environmental Leader Award, and a commendation from the Prince William Sound Regional Citizens Advisory Council. Additionally, Buono was listed among the Top One Hundred Most Influential People in Shipping 2012–2015 by Lloyd’s List.

In January 2022, Vice Admiral Buono submitted his retirement to the Department of Transportation after 45 years in the maritime industry. Vice Admiral Buono retired after graduating the class of 2022.

References 

1950s births
Year of birth uncertain
Living people
United States Navy officers